"Hitomi no Screen" is a single by Hey! Say! JUMP, released on February 24, 2010. The single debuted at No. 1 on the Oricon weekly charts.

Information
"Hitomi no Screen" was used as the theme song for the drama Hidarime Tantei EYE starring Hey! Say! JUMP member Ryosuke Yamada, Kanjani Eight's Yu Yokoyama, and actress Satomi Ishihara.

Hey! Say! 7's "Kagayaki Days" is also included in the single. Both limited edition and regular edition are released. The limited edition includes a DVD of the Promotional Video of "Hitomi no Screen" and making. The regular edition includes a song called "Romeo & Juliet", which is not in the limited edition, and three karaoke songs.

Regular Edition
CD
 "Hitomi no Screen"
 "Kagayaki Days" - Hey! Say! 7
 "Romeo & Juliet"
 "Hitomi no Screen" (Original Karaoke)
 "Kagayaki Days" (Original Karaoke) - Hey! Say! 7
 "Romeo & Juliet" (Original Karaoke)

Limited Edition
CD
 "Hitomi no Screen"
 "Kagayaki Days" - Hey! Say! 7
DVD
 "Hitomi no Screen" (PV & Making of)

Charts and certifications

Oricon sales chart (Japan)

Sales and certifications

References

2010 singles
Oricon Weekly number-one singles
Billboard Japan Hot 100 number-one singles
Hey! Say! JUMP songs
Japanese television drama theme songs
2010 songs
J Storm singles
Song articles with missing songwriters